This is a list of television stations in Denmark.

DR (Danish Broadcasting Corporation)

DR1
DR2
DR Ramasjang

Discontinued:
DR HD
DR Update
DR3
DR K
DR Ultra

TV 2

National:
TV 2
TV 2 Zulu
TV 2 Charlie
TV 2 News
TV 2 Fri
TV 2 Sport
TV 2 Sport X

Regional:
TV 2/Bornholm
TV 2/Fyn
TV 2/Lorry
TV/Midt-Vest
TV 2/Nord
TV Syd
TV 2 Øst
TV 2/Østjylland
Discontinued:
TV 2 Film

Viaplay Group

TV3 brand
TV3
TV3+
TV3 Puls
TV3 Sport
TV3 MAX
See

Viaplay brand
V Film Premiere
V Film Action
V Film Family
V Film Hits
V Series
V Sport Golf
V Sport Live
V Sport Ultra

Viasat brand
Viasat Explorer
Viasat Nature
Viasat History

Discontinued:
Sportkanalen
TV6
Viasat Film
Viasat Film Classic 
Viasat Film Comedy
Viasat Film Drama
Viasat Film Nordic
TV3 Sport 2

Paramount Nordics

MTV
Club MTV
MTV Hits
MTV Live
MTV 80s
MTV 90s
MTV 00s
Nickelodeon Denmark
Nick Jr.
Nicktoons

Discontinued:
Paramount Network
VH1 Denmark
VH1 Classic

C More Entertainment

C More Stars
C More First
C More Hits
C More Series
C More Golf
SF-kanalen

Discontinued:
Kiosk
SuperSport
C More Action
C More Emotion
C More Extreme
C More Film
C More Kids
C More Hockey
C More Tennis

Warner Bros. Discovery Denmark

Kanal 4
Kanal 5
6'eren
CANAL9
ID Discovery
Eurosport 1
Eurosport 2
TLC
Discovery Channel Denmark
Animal Planet Nordic
Discovery Science
Discovery HD
Cartoon Network
Boomerang
CNN International
Travel Channel

Discontinued:
7'eren
Discovery World
Turner Classic Movies

The Walt Disney Company Nordic

Disney

Disney Channel
Disney Junior

Discontinued:
Disney XD

National Geographic Partners

National Geographic
National Geographic Wild

Discontinued:
Nat Geo People

Fox Networks Group

Discontinued:
Xee

Other channels
dk4 (Tritel)
Al Jazeera (Al Jazeera Media Network)
Bloomberg (Bloomberg L.P.)
DW-TV (Deutsche Welle)
Euronews (Euronews SA)
FashionTV (FashionTV SA)
France 24 (France Médias Monde)
Mezzo (Groupe Les Échos-Le Parisien (50 %) & Groupe Canal+ (50 %))
Mezzo Live HD (Groupe Les Échos-Le Parisien (50 %) & Groupe Canal+ (50 %))
History (A+E Networks)
H2 (A+E Networks)
BBC Brit (BBC Studios)
BBC Earth (BBC Studios)
BBC World News (BBC Global News)
E! (NBCUniversal)
CNBC (NBCUniversal)
Sky News (Comcast)
CBS Reality (AMC Networks International)
Extreme Sports Channel (AMC Networks International)
Tegnsprogskanalen (DR & TV 2 Danmark)

Regional/local channels
24Nordjyske
24Sjællandske
Aabenraa Lokal TV
Aalborg+ (former AN-TV)
Kanal København
KTV Kolding

Providers

Digital Terrestrial:
Boxer TV A/S

Satellite:
Allente

Cable:
YouSee
Stofa
Waoo!

See also
Television in Denmark
Digital terrestrial television in Denmark

Television in Denmark
Television stations in Denmark
Denmark
Television stations